The Hebert House, also known as The Green House, is a historic house located near the intersection of Greenhouse Lane (Parish Road 123) and LA 3056 in Cameron Parish, Louisiana.

Built circa 1840 for cattleman Alexander Hebert, the house is one of the oldest remaining buildings in Southwest Louisiana. The house has a French Creole design; while common in Louisiana, the style is rare in its southwestern corner, which has few examples of styles predating Queen Anne architecture. The design features a large, steep gable roof, braced frame construction filled in with bousillage, and a brick cornice. The house's interior has a typical Acadian Creole layout, with a four-room first floor with no hall and a single-room second floor for sleeping.

The house was added to the National Register of Historic Places on December 8, 1997.

See also 
National Register of Historic Places listings in Cameron Parish, Louisiana

References

Houses on the National Register of Historic Places in Louisiana
Houses completed in 1840
Buildings and structures in Cameron Parish, Louisiana
National Register of Historic Places in Cameron Parish, Louisiana